The International Ibsen Award (Norwegian: Den internasjonale Ibsenprisen) honours an individual, institution or organization that has brought new artistic dimensions to the world of drama or theater. The committee consists of figures in the theatre community.

The prize was established by the Norwegian government in 2008, using the name of playwright Henrik Ibsen. It has no relation to Henrik Ibsen or the Ibsen family, and is solely the initiative of the Norwegian government. The winner is announced on 20 March, which is also Henrik Ibsen's birthday, and the prize consists of NOK 2,5 millions making it one of the richest literary prizes in the world. It is awarded at the Norwegian National Theatre's Ibsen festival every other year. The first laureate was British theatre and film director Peter Brook who received the prize on 31 August 2008 during the Ibsen Festival at the Nationaltheatret. The chair of the jury was Liv Ullmann. In 2011 the prize was made biennial, with the next awarding scheduled for September 2012. It was announced on 20 March that the 2012 award will go to Heiner Goebbels.

The International Ibsen Award has two predecessors, the Norwegian Ibsen Award and the Ibsen Centennial Commemoration Award, which was only awarded in 2006/2007.

Winners 
 2008 Peter Brook
 2009 Ariane Mnouchkine
 2010 Jon Fosse
 2012 Heiner Goebbels
 2014 Peter Handke
 2016 Forced Entertainment
 2018 Christoph Marthaler
 2020 Taylor Mac
 2022 Back to Back Theatre

See also 
Centre for Ibsen Studies
Ibsen Studies
 Norwegian Ibsen Award

References

External links
International Ibsen Award

Awards established in 2008
Norwegian theatre awards
Henrik Ibsen